TMT Development is a real estate development company based in Portland, Oregon. It was founded in 1988 by Tom Moyer.

The company owns and operates 8.5 million square feet of commercial real estate throughout Oregon and southwest Washington state. It is among the largest real estate companies in Portland.

History

In 1988, the company was founded by Tom Moyer.

In 1991, the company partnered with the Hillman Group to develop a 24-story office building in downtown Portland at 1000 Broadway, blocks from Pioneer Courthouse Square. The Hillman Group later sold its interest in the building to TMT Development. 

In 2000, the company completed Fox Tower, designed by TVA Architects and built by Hoffman Construction Company. 

In 2011, the family of the founder was engaged in a legal dispute over control when the founder was suffering from alzheimer's disease.

The 30-story mixed-use Park Avenue West, located next to Director Park and the Fox Tower in downtown Portland, was completed in 2016. By May 2016, the office space had been leased.  By August 2017, the residential portion was 90% leased. The building was taller than normally allowed by the building code, however TMT made a deal with the city that in exchange for exception from the zoning code on building height, the building would utilize union janitors and security, however these union jobs were not fulfilled.  In June 2019, Service Employees International Union Local 49 filed a lawsuit seeking to make this happen.

Delta Park Center and Oregon Beverage Recycling Cooperative 
In 2020, a clash over crowds at the BottleDrop beverage container redemption center located in TMT's Delta Park Center in North Portland has escalated due to the social distancing matters during the COVID-19 pandemic. On April 27, BottleDrop's landlord TMT Development set up a fence to limit how many people would line up outside, and keep them off a grass field, which TMT said is not part of BottleDrop's leased area. The appearance of armed guards and the lot fencing represent the new battle lines in a conflict that started on March 27, when TMT Development released a legal notice to OBRC which operates the BottleDrop that they had refused to fulfill the terms of its lease by allowing so many people to gather. TMT has not yet taken any legal action with respect to an eviction.

Shooting by contracted security guard 
A company by the name of Cornerstone Security had a contract to patrol Delta Park Center by TMT Development and it was asked to patrol the area leased to the tenant OBRC BottleDrop to monitor fights and drug dealing. In May 2021, a guard working for Cornerstone who was not licensed to carry a gun on the job fatally shot a subject in a vehicle near BotttleDrop who had been previously trespassed for matters relating to drug dealing.

References

Real estate companies established in 1988
Companies based in Portland, Oregon
Real estate companies of the United States
Property management companies
1988 establishments in Oregon
1988 establishments in the United States
Companies established in 1988